HMS Shrewsbury Castle was one of 44  built for the Royal Navy during the Second World War. She was named after Shrewsbury Castle in Shrewsbury. Completed in 1944, she was loaned to the Royal Norwegian Navy as a convoy escort during the war, renamed HNoMS Tunsberg Castle and was sunk by a mine in December 1944.

Design and description
The Castle-class corvette was a stretched version of the preceding Flower class, enlarged to improve seakeeping and to accommodate modern weapons. They were powered by a pair of triple-expansion steam engines, each driving one propeller shaft using steam provided by two Admiralty three-drum boilers. The ships' complement was 99 officers and ratings.

The Castle-class ships were equipped with a single QF  Mk XVI gun forward, but their primary weapon was their single three-barrel Squid anti-submarine mortar. This was backed up by one depth charge rail and two throwers for 15 depth charges. The ships were fitted with two twin and a pair of single mounts for  Oerlikon light AA guns. Provision was made for a further four single mounts if needed. They were equipped with Type 145Q and Type 147B ASDIC sets to detect submarines by reflections from sound waves beamed into the water. A Type 277 search radar and a HF/DF radio direction finder rounded out the Castles' sensor suite.

Construction and career
Shrewsbury Castle was laid down by Swan Hunter at their shipyard at Wallsend, on 5 May 1943 and launched on 16 August 1944. She was completed in April and served as a convoy escort.

Shrewsbury Castle was loaned to the Royal Norwegian Navy and renamed HNoMS Tunsberg Castle, her namesake was from Tunsberg Castle on 17 April 1944. On 12 December 1944, she hit a mine and sank with 5 crew members on board.

References 

 
 
 
 
 

 

Castle-class corvettes
1944 ships